A list of Spanish-produced and co-produced feature films released in Spain in 2010. When applicable, the domestic theatrical release date is favoured.

Films

Box office 
The ten highest-grossing Spanish films in 2010, by domestic box office gross revenue, are as follows:

See also 
 25th Goya Awards
 2010 in film

References 
Informational notes

Citations

External links
 Spanish films of 2010 at the Internet Movie Database

2010
Spanish
Films